Steffen Stranz (born 16 May 1960 in Kassel, Hessen) is a retired male judoka from Germany, who twice competed for West Germany at the Summer Olympics: 1984 and 1988.

In Seoul, South Korea (1988) he was eliminated in the quarterfinals of the Men's Lightweight (– 71 kg) division by East Germany's eventual silver medalist Sven Loll. Stranz twice won a bronze medal at the World Championships during his career.

References
sports-reference

1960 births
Living people
German male judoka
Judoka at the 1984 Summer Olympics
Judoka at the 1988 Summer Olympics
Olympic judoka of West Germany
Sportspeople from Kassel
20th-century German people